Kallone "beauty" is one third of the Greek trio of gods comprising Fate, Birth and Beauty; or Moira, Eileithyia and Kallone respectively.  She is described in Plato's Symposium as an aspect of birth:

This thing, pregnancy and bringing to birth, is divine, and it is immortal in the animal that is mortal.  It is impossible for this to happen in the unfitting; and the ugly is unfitting with everything divine, but the beautiful is fitting.  So Kallone is the Moira and Eileithyia for birth.

She is described by mythologist Seth Benardete as a cult name for Artemis-Hecate.

References 
 

Greek goddesses
Time and fate goddesses
Childhood goddesses
Artemis
Hecate
Beauty goddesses